Sergio Fabián Núñez Rosas (born 30 June 2000) is a Uruguayan professional footballer who plays as a forward for Greek Super League 2 club AEL, on loan from Peñarol.

Career
A youth academy graduate of Peñarol, Núñez made his professional debut on 16 August 2020 in Peñarol's 2–0 win against Boston River. In April 2021, he joined Cerrito on a season long loan deal.

On 12 January 2023, Greek club AEL announced the signing of Núñez on a one-year loan deal.

Career statistics

References

External links
 

2000 births
Living people
Association football forwards
Uruguayan footballers
Uruguayan Primera División players
Super League Greece 2 players
Peñarol players
Sportivo Cerrito players
Asteras Tripolis F.C. players
Uruguayan expatriate footballers
Uruguayan expatriate sportspeople in Greece
Expatriate footballers in Greece